Camptonotus carolinensis, the Carolina leaf-roller, is a species of raspy cricket in the family Gryllacrididae. It is found in the eastern United States.

References

External links

 

Gryllacrididae
Articles created by Qbugbot
Insects described in 1860